The men's 400 metres hurdles event at the 2007 Asian Athletics Championships was held in Amman, Jordan on July 26–27.

Medalists

Results

Heats

Final

References
Heats results
Final results

2007 Asian Athletics Championships
400 metres hurdles at the Asian Athletics Championships